Charles Pressley Smith  was an Anglican priest.

Born into an ecclesiastical family  in Fraserburgh in 1862, he was educated at Aberdeen University and ordained after a period of study at Edinburgh Theological College in 1885. Initially, he was a Curate at Edinburgh Cathedral and then Priest in charge of St Martin's, Edinburgh. He was Rector of  St John's, Oban  and in 1897 became  its Dean until 1987, a post he held until 1930. He died on 9 September 1935.

Notes

1862 births
1935 deaths
Alumni of the University of Aberdeen

Deans of Argyll and The Isles